Astatumen is a genus of tardigrades in the class Eutardigrada found in Romania. Species of this genus were originally categorized in the genus Itaquascon until 1997.

Species
 Astatumen bartosi (Wêglarska, 1959)
 Astatumen tamaensis (Sudzuki 1975)
 Astatumen tamurai (Ito 1990)
 Astatumen trinacriae (Arcidiacono, 1962)

References

Parachaela
Tardigrade genera
Polyextremophiles